Anna Dharmam is a term used for an Ayyavazhi ritual that involves sharing food without inter-dining. Inter-dining refers to the act of dining within one's own caste, and excluding others. The practice of Anna Dharmam may have emerged in association with inter-dining.

Origin
Inter-dining was an important activity that originated in the gatherings of Ayyavazhi. People of different castes would travel bringing with them food materials for cooking their meals when they came to meet Ayya Vaikundar. Food, with its ritual significance, was distributed to the needy and to all those gathered around Ayya Vaikundar. They cooked and ate in the presence of Ayya Vaikundar. This common place action evolved into a significant practice of inter-dining between persons of different groups, cutting across the boundaries of caste restrictions. This practice, being performed in a religious setting with certain measure of earnestness and respect, seems to have acquired the character of a ritual too.

Unpan Annam
Today, the food being served as Anna Dharmam is known as Unpan Annam, literally meaning "the food to be eaten," and it has its own specific method of preparation. Rice, vegetables, and spices are cooked and mixed together for the purpose. Then it is served ceremoniously. When it is served, the partakers wait until everyone is served. Then a question is posed customarily by the partakers: "Ayya annam kutikkalama ?" (Ayya, may we eat the meal?) and when it is answered by those who serve as "Ayya annam kutiyunkal" (You may kindly eat the meal), the partakers eat the meal. This was to ensure that everyone got the meal. The poor and the rich - all partake of this meal without discrimination. It was considered as a religious virtue to partake of this meal. 

Another variant of Anna Dharmam known as Palvaippu, the serving of 'gruel-like food boiled in milk.' Presently, every center of worship of Ayyavazhi has this practice once a month. Anna Dharmam in one form or the other is a daily feature in most of the worship centres of Ayyavazhi, For instance, Swamithoppe practice it daily.

See also
Ayyavazhi religious practices

Ayyavazhi rituals